Ashley Thomas Cain (born 27 September 1990) is a former footballer who played for Championship side Coventry City. He also had loan spells at Luton, Oxford United, and Mansfield Town, where he played as a winger.

Cain is an MTV reality TV personality, starring in the series Ex on the Beach and competing on the 33rd season of the reality game show The Challenge. Cain also modelled for brands such as Kalibre Clothing and The Couture Club.

Early life
Ashley Thomas Cain was born on September 27, 1990, in Nuneaton, England. He is of British and Vincentian descent.

Career

Coventry City
He made his professional debut for Coventry City as a substitute on 13 April 2009 in a 0–0 Football League Championship draw with Charlton Athletic. He signed a one-year professional contract with the club in July 2007. He made his first start for the club on 12 August 2009 in a League Cup defeat to Hartlepool United.

Luton Town
On 26 November 2009, Cain signed on a one-month loan with Conference Premier side Luton Town, making just one substitute appearance in a 0–0 draw at Chester City, although his only appearance for the club would later be wiped from the record books after Chester folded later in the season and their record was expunged.

Oxford United
On 19 February 2010, Cain joined Conference league leaders Oxford United on a one-month loan after scoring a hat-trick in the first 45 minutes against them in a mid season friendly match. He then had a trial with Port Vale in April 2010.

Mansfield Town
At the end of the 2009–10 season Coventry City told Cain he was surplus to requirements and he was subsequently released. He signed for Mansfield Town on 26 July 2010. Halfway through the season Cain established his place in the team.

Tamworth
On 22 June 2011, Cain was picked up by Conference Premier side Tamworth. He was joined at the club the same day by former Coventry City teammate Liam Francis, who signed from Hednesford Town.

AFC Telford United
On 18 November 2011, Cain was loaned to AFC Telford United until 5 January 2012.

In January 2012 his contract was cancelled by Tamworth and he joined Telford on a permanent basis. He was released by the club in May 2012.

CS Gaz Metan Mediaș
In June 2012, Cain signed for CS Gaz Metan Mediaș after a successful trial period. He played in three trial games, scoring three goals and getting four assists. This attracted big name teams in the Romanian Liga 1 such as CFR 1907 Cluj. Gaz Metan quickly decided to negotiate a contract and take Cain on a pre-season tour. During his first game for them he suffered a complete rupture of his right Achilles tendon, which would keep him out for the rest of the season, so he returned to England to receive treatment and recover. Because of this injury, he had to leave the club.

Personal life
Cain's daughter, Azaylia Diamond Cain, died on 24 April 2021, at eight months old. She was diagnosed with an aggressive form of leukemia at eight weeks old. Prior to her death, Cain and his partner, Safiyya Vorajee, had raised more than £1.5m to fund for her specialist treatment in Singapore. Cain expressed grief over her death on social media. In May 2021, he and Vorajee announced that they were starting a charity in their daughter's name to fight childhood cancer.

References

External links

1990 births
Sportspeople from Nuneaton
Living people
Association football midfielders
English footballers
Coventry City F.C. players
Luton Town F.C. players
Oxford United F.C. players
Mansfield Town F.C. players
Tamworth F.C. players
AFC Telford United players
Coventry Sphinx F.C. players
Bedworth United F.C. players
Barwell F.C. players
English Football League players
National League (English football) players
English people of Saint Vincent and the Grenadines descent
The Challenge (TV series) contestants